Fields Store is an unincorporated community in northeast Waller County, Texas, United States.

The community is located at the junction of Farm to Market Road 362 North and Farm to Market Road 1488.

Education
The settlement is within Waller Independent School District.

Schools serving Field Store include:
Waller High School (Unincorporated Harris County)
Waller Junior High School (Waller)
Wayne C. Schultz Middle School (Unincorporated Harris County)
Fields Store Elementary School (Unincorporated Waller County)

External links

Unincorporated communities in Waller County, Texas
Unincorporated communities in Texas